Viki Kahlon is an Israeli footballer who plays in Ironi Tiberias.

He made his debut for the senior side in a league game against F.C. Ashdod on 20 April 2013.

Honours
Liga Leumit
Winner (2): 2013-14, 2016-17

References

1993 births
Living people
Israeli Jews
Israeli footballers
Maccabi Netanya F.C. players
Hapoel Petah Tikva F.C. players
Hapoel Nir Ramat HaSharon F.C. players
Hapoel Nof HaGalil F.C. players
Ironi Tiberias F.C. players
Israeli Premier League players
Liga Leumit players
Footballers from Netanya
Association football fullbacks